Kuwaritol is a town in Nagaon district in Assam, India

Location
National Highway 37A starts from Kuwaritol. It connects the town to Tezpur, which is 23 km away

References

External links
 About Kuwaritol

Cities and towns in Nagaon district